Firuz Kola-ye Sofla (also Romanized as Fīrūz Kolā-ye Soflá; also known as Fīrūz Kolā-ye Pā’īn) is a village in Dasht-e Sar Rural District, Dabudasht District, Amol County, Mazandaran Province, Iran. At the 2006 census, its population was 841, in 227 families.

References 

Populated places in Amol County